Hebert Hoyos Ayala (born 29 April 1956) is a Bolivian former footballer who played as a goalkeeper. He played in 15 matches for the Bolivia national football team from 1979 to 1985. He was also part of Bolivia's squad for the 1979 Copa América tournament.

References

External links
 

1956 births
Living people
Bolivian footballers
Bolivia international footballers
Place of birth missing (living people)
Association football goalkeepers
1979 Copa América players